The Isua Iron Mine is a proposed mine in Greenland.

Concept
The plan is to ship iron ore from open-pit mines in Greenland to manufacturers in Europe and Asia.
Like the Baffinland Iron Mine on Baffin Island, the costs of placing a mine in a remote area will be compensated by the high quality of the ore.  The ore will be 70 percent iron, so it will require minimal processing before being shipped.

The mine site is approximately 150 kilometres northeast of Nuuk, just south of the Arctic Circle.  
The mine would be at the same latitude as Maniitsoq, a small port on Greenland's west coast, about 100 kilometres away.  The mine would be at the edge of Greenland's ice cap.

The port would be built in Taseraarssuk Bay.
The bay is ice-free year-round.

History and time plan

London mining
In 2011, according to London Mining Incorporated, the firm planning to develop the site, the mine would be constructed and in operation by 2015.  
It was projected to ship 15 million tonnes of ore per year.
However, Jane George, of Nunatsiaq, reported on April 23, 2013, due to a drop in the price of iron ore, development of the mine had stalled. In October 2013 London Mining and the Greenland Government signed an agreement giving an exploitation license for the mine.
Construction had been projected to cost at least $2.35 billion.

Jane George, of Nunatsiaq, compared the relative open-ness and transparency with which Baffinland prepared for its environmental review with the criticism London Mining received for its opacity.
She pointed out that London Mining had been criticized for failing to effectively publicize its public information meetings, and it had been criticized for a failure to prepare briefing materials in the Danish language and in Greenlandic.

In October 2014, the company London Mining went bankrupt, due to low ore prices and the fact that its largest mine in Sierra Leone was affected by the Ebola outbreak.

General Nice
In January 2015, the Chinese company General Nice bought the Isua mining project. As of 2016, development of the mine was on hold due to iron prices being too low to make the project economical.

In November of 2021, the government of Greenland revoked General Nice's license for the project, citing inactivity at the site, and unpaid fees.

References

Iron mines in Greenland
Qeqqata